When You Finish Saving the World is an Audible Original audio first production audio drama published on August 4, 2020 by American actor, author, and playwright Jesse Eisenberg.  It won the 2021 Audie Award for "Original Work".

Plot
When You Finish Saving the World tells the story of three individuals working to understand each other and themselves: Nathan, a father learning to connect with his newborn son; Rachel, a young college student seeking to find her place in a relationship and in life, before marriage to Nathan; and Ziggy, their son, a teenager hoping to figure out where he came from, and where he's headed. The shifts between time frames in these characters' lives span more than a decade and depicts the complexities of growing up, having children, and fitting in.

Characters 
 Jesse Eisenberg as Nathan Katz
 Finn Wolfhard as Ziggy Katz
 Kaitlyn Dever as Rachel Katz

Adaptations

 When You Finish Saving the World is a 2022 film adaptation based on the audiobook directed and written by Jesse Eisenberg, starring Julianne Moore and Finn Wolfhard, and produced by Moore, Emma Stone and Dave McCary. The film adaptation will take place in the present day and focus on the mother and son relationship, while keeping other details the same, such as Ziggy's mother running a shelter for victims of domestic violence, which she does in the audio version as well.

Awards and honors

References

External links
 Official Audible page

2020 American novels
Audiobooks